Horia is a commune in Constanța County, Northern Dobruja, Romania.

The commune includes three villages:
 Horia (historical name: Musubei) - named after Vasile Ursu Nicola, also known as Horea, one of the leaders of the 1784-1785 peasant revolt in Transylvania
 Cloșca  (historical name: Musul) - named after Ion Oargă, also known as Cloșca, one of the leaders of the 1784-1785 peasant revolt in Transylvania
 Tichilești

Demographics
At the 2011 census, Horia had 1,072 Romanians (96.1%), 3 others (0.2%).

References

Communes in Constanța County
Localities in Northern Dobruja